Adventures in Blues is an album by the Stan Kenton Orchestra featuring compositions by Gene Roland recorded in late 1961 and released by Capitol Records in 1963.

Reception

The Allmusic review by Scott Yanow noted "This is one of the finer recordings by the Mellophonium Band, arguably Stan Kenton's last great orchestra. With the use of 20 horns, Roland was able to get a surprising amount of variety out of the material, making this a Kenton recording well worth investigating". On All About Jazz William Grim wrote "This may be the most swinging of all of Kenton's albums because the arrangements were done by Gene Roland, the most consistently swinging of all of the great arrangers who honed their talents writing for the Kenton juggernaut. ...Adventures in Blues is a great album and gives conclusive proof that when the music called for it, the Stan Kenton Orchestra could swing with the best of them".

Track listing
All compositions by Gene Roland.
 "Reuben's Blues" - 4:26
 "Dragonwyck" - 4:40
 "Blue Ghost" - 4:18
 "Exit Stage Left" - 4:18
 "Night at the Gold Nugget" - 5:36
 "Formula SK-32" - 3:06
 "Aphrodisia" - 3:11
 "Fitz" - 4:30
 "The Blue's Story" - 3:22		
Recorded at Capitol Studios in Hollywood, CA on December 7, 1961 (tracks 1, 3 & 4), December 12, 1961 (track 8), December 13, 1961 (tracks 2, 5 & 9) and December 14, 1961 (tracks 6 & 7).

Personnel
Stan Kenton - piano
Bob Behrendt, Norman Baltazar, Bob Rolfe, Dalton Smith, Marvin Stamm - trumpet
Dee Barton, Bob Fitzpatrick, Bud Parker - trombone
Jim Amlotte, - bass trombone
Dave Wheeler - bass trombone, tuba
Dwight Carver, Keith LaMotte, Carl Saunders, Ray Starling - mellophone
Gene Roland mellophone, soprano saxophone, arranger, conductor
Gabe Baltazar - alto saxophone
Buddy Arnold, Sam Donahue (tracks 2, 5, 6 & 7), Paul Renzi - tenor saxophone
Allan Beutler - baritone saxophone
Joel Kaye - baritone saxophone, bass saxophone
Pat Senatore - bass 
Jerry McKenzie - drums

References

Stan Kenton albums
1963 albums
Capitol Records albums
Albums conducted by Gene Roland

Albums recorded at Capitol Studios
Albums produced by Lee Gillette